Houska Castle is an early Gothic castle in the municipality of Blatce in the Liberec Region of the Czech Republic. It is one of the best preserved castles of the period. Some notable features of the castle include a predominantly Gothic chapel, green chamber with late-Gothic paintings, and a knight's drawing room.

Folklore considers this castle to cover one of the gateways to Hell, built to prevent demons (trapped in lower levels) from reaching the rest of the world.

History
 
Houska Castle was built in the second half of the 13th century probably on the orders of Bohemian ruler Ottokar II of Bohemia during his reign (1253–78) to serve as an administration center from which the extensive royal estates could be managed. Later on, it passed to the hands of the aristocracy, frequently passing from the ownership of one to another. The castle was built in an area of forests, swamps and mountains with no external fortifications, no source of water except for a cistern to collect rainwater,  no kitchen, far from any trade routes, and with no occupants at its time of completion. From 1584 to 1590, it underwent Renaissance-style modifications, losing none of its fortress features as it looks down from a steep rocky cliff. In the 18th century, it stopped serving as a noble residence and fell into a state of disrepair before being renovated in 1823. In 1897, it was purchased by Princess Hohenlohe and in 1924, the times of the First Republic, bought by the President of Škoda, Josef Šimonek. As of 2020, it was owned by his descendants.

During World War II, the Wehrmacht occupied the castle until 1945. The Nazis were said to have conducted experiments into the occult. 
According to one source, there were "multiple myths about their supposed occult involvements there". Another source states locals believed that the Nazis had been using the "powers of Hell" for their experiments. As of early 2020, the castle was open to the public and had been since 1999. Tourists may visit the chapel with fading frescoes and murals "including pictures of demon-like figures and animal-like beings".

Houska Castle, and most specifically the chapel, was constructed over a large hole in the ground that is a "gateway to Hell", which is allegedly so deep that no one could see the bottom of it. Animal-human hybrids were reported to have crawled out of it, and dark-winged, otherworldly creatures flew in its vicinity. Legend has it that when construction began in the castle, all of the prisoners that were sentenced to death were offered a pardon if they consented to be lowered by rope into the hole, and report back on what they saw. When the first person was lowered, he began screaming after a few seconds, and when pulled back to the surface, he looked as if he had aged 30 years. He had grown wrinkles and his hair had turned white.

According to the Prague Tourism web site, the castle is reputed to have various types of ghosts, "a bullfrog/human creature, a headless horse, and an old woman" as well as the remains of "demonic beasts who escaped the pit".

The pit in the lower levels of the castle is said to be a gateway to hell. Thus, by constructing the Gothic building's defensive walls facing inward, they were able to keep the demons trapped in the lower level's thickest walls closest to the hole of the castle.

In popular culture
The Travel Channel series "Legendary Locations" covered several sites in Season 2, Episode 4, including the castle "said to protect a portal to hell".

Houska Castle was featured on an episode of Ghost Hunters International which aired on SyFy on 22 July 2009. Most Haunted Live visited the castle on March 26, 2010. The French team of paranormal investigators, R.I.P recherches investigations paranormal, investigated the Castle in 2013 in their episode "The Hell Gate" (Episode 3, Season 2).

This folklore was also the basis for the Doctor Who graphic novel Herald of Madness (2019), which is set at Houska Castle and was first published in Doctor Who Magazine 535–539.

References

External links
 Official pages of Houska Castle

Castles in the Liberec Region
Česká Lípa District